KRDQ is an FM radio station licensed to Colby, Kansas and broadcasting on a frequency of 100.3 Megahertz.

KRDQ airs a hot adult contemporary format and is owned by Melia Communications.

References

External links

RDQ